Holding on to You may refer to:

 "Holding on to You" (Peter Frampton song)
 "Holding on to You" (Twenty One Pilots song)